The 1997 NCAA Division I men's lacrosse tournament was the 27th annual Division I NCAA Men's Lacrosse Championship tournament. Twelve NCAA Division I college men's lacrosse teams met after having played their way through a regular season, and for some, a conference tournament.

The championship game was played at Maryland's Byrd Stadium in front of 25,317 fans,  The game saw the Princeton University defeat University of Maryland by the score of 19–7. 

This was Princeton's second consecutive national championship under Head Coach Bill Tierney, and their fourth title since 1992. Princeton won 29 straight games over three seasons.

Tournament bracket

 * = Overtime

All-Tournament Team
Jon Hess, Princeton (Named the tournament's Most Outstanding Player)
Jesse Hubbard, Princeton
Chris Massey, Princeton
Becket Wolf, Princeton
Pat Cairns, Princeton
Matt Hahn, Maryland
Andrew Whipple, Maryland
Casey Powell, Syracuse
John Fay, Duke
Rob Kavovit, Syracuse

See also
1997 NCAA Division I Women's Lacrosse Championship
1997 NCAA Division II Lacrosse Championship
1997 NCAA Division III Men's Lacrosse Championship

References 

NCAA Division I Men's Lacrosse Championship
NCAA Division I Men's Lacrosse Championship
1997 in lacrosse